ISO 3166-1 numeric (or numeric-3) codes are three-digit country codes defined in ISO 3166-1, part of the ISO 3166 standard published by the International Organization for Standardization (ISO), to represent countries, dependent territories, and special areas of geographical interest. They are similar to the three-digit country codes developed and maintained by the United Nations Statistics Division, from which they originate in its UN M.49 standard. They were first included as part of the ISO 3166 standard in its second edition in 1981, but they were released by the United Nations Statistics Division since as early as 1970.

An advantage of numeric codes over alphabetic codes is script (writing system) independence. The ISO 3166-1 alphabetic codes (alpha-2 and alpha-3) use letters from the 26-letter English alphabet and are suitable for languages based on the Latin alphabet. For people and systems using non-Latin scripts (such as Arabic or Japanese), the English alphabet may be unavailable or difficult to use, understand, or correctly interpret. While numeric codes overcome the problems of script dependence, this independence comes at the cost of loss of mnemonic convenience.

Another advantage is that when countries merge or split, they will get a new numeric code, while the alphabetic code stays in use for (a part of) that country. A persistent number is needed in datasets with historical country information.

Current codes

Officially assigned code elements
The following is a complete list of the current officially assigned ISO 3166-1 numeric codes, using a title case version of the English short names officially used by the ISO 3166 Maintenance Agency (ISO 3166/MA):

User-assigned code elements
User-assigned code elements are codes at the disposal of users who need to add further names of countries, territories, or other geographical entities to their in-house application of ISO 3166-1. The ISO 3166/MA will never use these codes in the updating process of the standard. The numeric codes  to  can be user-assigned.

Withdrawn codes
When countries merge, split, or undergo territorial change, their numeric codes are withdrawn and new numeric codes are assigned. For example:
 East Germany and West Germany used numeric codes  and  respectively before their unification in 1990. Since then, the unified Germany has used numeric code , while keeping the alphabetic codes for West Germany (except in the banking area where they still use the  code).
 Ethiopia used numeric code  before Eritrea split away in 1993. Since then, Ethiopia has used numeric code , while keeping the same alphabetic codes.
 Sudan used numeric code  before South Sudan split away in 2011. Since then, Sudan has used numeric code , while keeping the same alphabetic codes.

If a country changes its name without any territorial change, its numeric code remains the same. For example, when Burma was renamed Myanmar without territorial change in 1989, its alphabetic codes were changed, but its numeric code  has remained the same.

The following numeric codes have been withdrawn from ISO 3166-1:

The following numeric codes were also assigned by the United Nations Statistics Division, but these territories were never officially included in ISO 3166-1:

In the UN M.49 standard developed by the United Nations Statistics Division, additional numeric codes are used to represent geographical regions and groupings of countries and areas for statistical processing purposes, but these codes are not included in ISO 3166-1. Unlike alphabetic codes, there are no reserved numeric codes in ISO 3166-1.

References

Sources and external links
 ISO 3166 Maintenance Agency, International Organization for Standardization (ISO)
 Standard Country or Area Codes for Statistical Use, United Nations Statistics Division
 Countries or areas, codes and abbreviations — list of alpha-3 and numeric codes (a few territories officially assigned codes in ISO 3166-1 are not included in this list)
 Composition of macro geographical (continental) regions, geographical sub-regions, and selected economic and other groupings
 Country or area numerical codes added or changed since 1982
 The World Factbook (public domain), Central Intelligence Agency
 Appendix D – Cross-Reference List of Country Data Codes — comparison of FIPS 10, ISO 3166, and STANAG 1059 country codes
 Administrative Divisions of Countries ("Statoids"), Statoids.com
 Country codes — comparison of ISO 3166-1 country codes with other country codes
 ISO 3166-1 Change History

1 numeric
Country codes
Location codes